Sankt Anna may refer to:

 Sankt Anna am Aigen, a municipality in the district of Südoststeiermark in Styria, Austria
 Sankt Anna am Lavantegg, a former municipality in the district of Murtal in Styria, Austria